is a top-view shoot-'em-up game originally released in 1993 by Konami for the Super Famicom in Japan. The game was also released for the Super Nintendo Entertainment System in the PAL region. It is the sixth game in the TwinBee series and a direct follow-up to the arcade game Detana!! TwinBee (Bells & Whistles). The European version was published by Konami's Palcom Software division and was the first of three TwinBee games localized for the European market, followed by a Game Boy version of Pop'n TwinBee (which was actually an earlier game titled TwinBee Da!! in Japan) and the side-scrolling platform game Pop'n TwinBee: Rainbow Bell Adventures. It was released in North America 27 years after its Super Famicom launch through a February 2020 update to the Nintendo Switch Online Super NES library.

Plot
The game's opening sequence shows TwinBee and WinBee patrolling the skies of Donburi Island when they suddenly receive a distress signal from a young girl named Madoka. Madoka reveals that she is the granddaughter of Dr. Mardock, who was once a benevolent scientist until a bump in the head turned him insane. Dr. Mardock now seeks to conquer the world with an army of Acorn Men and only TwinBee and WinBee can stop him.

Gameplay
The gameplay is similar to Detana!! TwinBee, the second coin-op game in the series, but with a few notable additions and changes. Like in previous TwinBee, up to two players can play simultaneously, Player 1 controls TwinBee (the blue aircraft), while Player 2 controls WinBee (the pink aircraft) When the player begins the game, they'll be asked to enter their name and choose between three types of companion ships (whether their companions will follow their ship, engulf them, or surround them). The player's objective is to maneuver their spacecraft through a series of seven stages and defeat every enemy who gets in the way, facing a boss at the end of each stage. Unlike previous games, instead of extra lives, the player has a life meter that determines how much damage the player's ship can take before losing. When the player loses, they will be given a chance to restart at the stage where they left off, but only limited chances are given to continue.

Like in previous TwinBee games, the player shoots at airborne enemies with their gun and drops bombs to the land. The player can also attack airborne enemies with their ship's punches as well at close range. The player can shoot tiny-sized replicas of their ship that will fly and attack all on-screen enemies. The player can only perform this attack based on the number of stocks they have. During a 2-player game, one player can give the other player a bit of their life energy to replenish it or even use the other player's ship as a projectile against the enemy. As usual, the main power-up items are bells that can change colors by shooting them in the air, giving the player a different upgrade when one is retrieved depending on the bell's color.

On the game's option settings, the player can adjust the game's difficulty, controls, and sound, as well as switch between "normal" and "couple" mode. During couple mode, the enemy attacks will aim primarily at Player 1 if two players are playing together. This feature is intended to allow less experienced players enjoy the game if they're playing with a more experience partner.

Reception 
The game was reviewed by Weekly Famitsu, and was given a score of 30 out of 40.

References

External links
 TwinBee Portable at Konami 
Official website (in Japanese)

1993 video games
Super Nintendo Entertainment System games
TwinBee games
Vertically-oriented video games
Video game sequels
Video games developed in Japan
Video games scored by Michiru Yamane
Virtual Console games
Virtual Console games for Wii U
Nintendo Switch Online games